The 2011–12 Bulgarian Hockey League season was the 60th season of the Bulgarian Hockey League, the top level of ice hockey in Bulgaria. Three teams participated in the league, and HK Slavia Sofia won the championship.

Regular season

External links
 Season on eurohockey.com

Bulgar
Bulgarian Hockey League seasons
Bulg